Derrick Samuel Alston Sr. (born August 20, 1972) is an American basketball coach and former player.

Early life
Born in The Bronx, New York, Alston played basketball at Hoboken High School in Hoboken, New Jersey.

Professional career
Alston, a power forward/center from Duquesne University, started off his professional career when he was selected 33rd overall in the 1994 NBA Draft by the Philadelphia 76ers for whom he played two seasons. He then played 2 games for the Atlanta Hawks in late 1996 before taking his game overseas.

Joining the New Zealand Breakers mid-season 2007–08, Alston made an immediate impact. Statwise, he reached the top 20 in the league for FG%, shooting at 56.0%, and offensive rebounds, while averaging 13.8 ppg and being instrumental in helping the Breakers reach the playoffs for the first time in club history.

Career statistics

NBA

|-
| align="left" | 1994–95
| align="left" | Philadelphia
| 64 || 1 || 16.1 || .465 || .000 || .492 || 3.4 || 0.5 || 0.6 || 0.5 || 4.7
|-
| align="left" | 1995–96
| align="left" | Philadelphia
| 73 || 41 || 22.1 || .512 || .333 || .491 || 4.1 || 0.8 || 0.8 || 0.7 || 6.2
|-
| align="left" | 1996–97
| align="left" | Atlanta
| 2 || 0 || 5.5 || .000 || .000 || .000 || 2.0 || 0.0 || 0.0 || 0.0 || 0.0
|- class="sortbottom"
| style="text-align:center;" colspan="2"| Career
| 139 || 42 || 19.1 || .489 || .143 || .487 || 3.8 || 0.7 || 0.7 || 0.6 || 5.4
|}

College

|-
| align="left" | 1990–91
| align="left" | Duquesne
| 28 || 25 || 28.8 || .536 || .000 || .598 || 6.3 || 1.3 || 0.8 || 1.9 || 11.3
|-
| align="left" | 1991–92
| align="left" | Duquesne
| 28 || - || 32.8 || .556 || .000 || .526 || 8.0 || 1.5 || 1.2 || 2.1 || 13.9
|-
| align="left" | 1992–93
| align="left" | Duquesne
| 28 || 27 || 34.3 || .563 || 1.000 || .574 || 9.3 || 1.1 || 1.4 || 2.1 || 19.9
|-
| align="left" | 1993–94
| align="left" | Duquesne
| 30 || - || 36.0 || .578 || .000 || .601 || 7.3 || 1.4 || 1.6 || 1.8 || 21.3
|- class="sortbottom"
| style="text-align:center;" colspan="2"| Career
| 114 || 52 || 33.0 || .561 || .333 || .576 || 7.7 || 1.3 || 1.2 || 2.0 || 16.7
|}

Coaching career
After retiring, in 2012, Alston joined the staff of the Houston Rockets and served as their Player Development Coach for two seasons 2012–2015. On October 27, 2015 he was hired by the Westchester Knicks to be an assistant coach.

In August 2014, Alston traveled to the Philippines as a SportsUnited Sports Envoy for the U.S. Department of State. In this function, he worked with Alison Feaster and Erik Spoelstra to conduct basketball clinics and events for more than 375 youth from underserved areas. In so doing, Alston helped contribute to SportsUnited's mission to advance the status of women and girls around the world and to show support to an important regional partner.

In August 2019, he was named head coach of the Westchester Knicks of the NBA G League. He held the head coaching position until the end of the 2021-22 season. On October 25, 2022, Alston was named an assistant coach of the NBA G League's College Park Skyhawks.

Personal life
Alston's son Derrick Alston Jr. was a college basketball player at Boise State, before embarking on a career in professional basketball. Alston also has a daughter (Avery).

References

External links
Eurobasket.com profile
 basketball reference.com
ACB.com profile
College Stats

1972 births
Living people
American expatriate basketball people in Argentina
American expatriate basketball people in Croatia
American expatriate basketball people in France
American expatriate basketball people in New Zealand
American expatriate basketball people in Russia
American expatriate basketball people in Spain
American expatriate basketball people in Turkey
American men's basketball players
Anadolu Efes S.K. players
Atlanta Hawks players
Basketball coaches from New Jersey
Basketball coaches from New York (state)
Basketball players from New Jersey
Basketball players from New York City
Bàsquet Manresa players
BCM Gravelines players
Boca Juniors basketball players
Centers (basketball)
Duquesne Dukes men's basketball players
FC Barcelona Bàsquet players
Hoboken High School alumni
KK Split players
La Unión basketball players
Libertad de Sunchales basketball players
Liga ACB players
PBC Ural Great players
Philadelphia 76ers draft picks
Philadelphia 76ers players
Power forwards (basketball)
Real Madrid Baloncesto players
Sportspeople from Hoboken, New Jersey
Sportspeople from the Bronx
Türk Telekom B.K. players
Valencia Basket players
Westchester Knicks coaches